Baraka is a fictional character in the Mortal Kombat fighting game franchise by Midway Games/NetherRealm Studios. Introduced in Mortal Kombat II (1993), he is a Tarkatan, a fictional species residing in Outworld, and his distinctive feature is a set of long metal blades that retract into his forearms. Baraka is a recurring villain throughout the series, often depicted in the service of the franchise's primary villains as well as the occasional love interest to the half-Tarkatan Mileena. The character has received a positive reception for his appearance and Fatality finishing moves.

Appearances

Mortal Kombat games
Baraka is first introduced in Mortal Kombat II (1993) as a member of a lowly Outworld race called the Nomads who are known for violent and unpredictable behavior. He spearheads the attack on Liu Kang's Shaolin temple in Earthrealm following the conclusion of the first Mortal Kombat tournament, which in turn lures Liu Kang into Outworld to seek vengeance. 

In the storyline of Mortal Kombat Trilogy (1996), Baraka is a member of Kahn's forces after successfully fighting an "uprising renegade race in Outworld's lower regions" and takes part in Kahn's ensuing invasion of Earthrealm. 

Baraka is not playable in the next fighting installment, Mortal Kombat 4 (1997), but was added to the roster of the 2000 Sega Dreamcast-exclusive upgrade Mortal Kombat Gold. He encounters the sorcerer Quan Chi, who offers him a chance to rule the Outworld realm of Edenia by his side if he agrees to join the fallen Elder God Shinnok's army. While Baraka accepts, he secretly plans to betray his new masters. In his noncanonical ending, Baraka balks at ruling the now-empty realm alongside Quan Chi after Shinnok and his followers are eliminated, and is killed by Quan Chi after a failed assassination attempt.

In Mortal Kombat: Deception (2004), Baraka and the remainder of his Tarkatan race ally themselves with the arisen Dragon King Onaga. Baraka recruits the mutant clone Mileena into Onaga's ranks in order to pose as Edenian Princess Kitana. 

Baraka is playable along with the entire series roster in Mortal Kombat: Armageddon (2006), but was not among the seventeen characters therein who received an official biography by Midway Games, and he played no part in the game's storyline.

In the 2011 Mortal Kombat reboot that retells the events of the first three games, Baraka appears as a recurring foe in the story mode who is defeated by Johnny Cage, Cyrax, Jax, and Jade. In the retold storyline of Mortal Kombat II, he leads his Tarkatan armies in an invasion of Earthrealm.

Baraka returns in Mortal Kombat X (2015) as a non-playable character. He and his fellow Tarkatans aid the insectoid D'Vorah in loading captive Shaolin monks before they are confronted and defeated by Raiden, Liu Kang, and Kung Lao. Five years prior to the game's story mode, Baraka serves under then-Outworld ruler Mileena alongside D'Vorah. During a meeting with the Osh-Tekk Kotal Kahn, Baraka is killed after D'Vorah betrays Mileena.

In Mortal Kombat 11, a past version of Baraka is brought to the present by the keeper of time Kronika. After learning of his death and Kotal Kahn rendering the Tarkatans on the brink of extinction, he initially allies himself with Kronika and a similarly time-displaced Shao Kahn. However, Kitana convinces him to aid her in rescuing Kotal by assuring him that she will convince him to treat the Tarkatans with respect. He and the Tarkatans later take part in Kitana's battle against Shao Kahn and in the final battle against Kronika.

Design
Baraka was first conceived by MK co-creator John Tobias as a "savage barbarian demon warrior" as part of the early development process of the first Mortal Kombat. The character was visualized for MKII with a Nosferatu mask adorned with silver-painted false fingernails serving as his teeth, and his arm blades were constructed from silver cardboard. He was portrayed by actor and martial artist Richard Divizio in the game.

Early Baraka concept art by Tobias portrayed him as a masked bald human ninja with hookswords and then a muscular creature with metal talon-studded forearms until his arm blades — inspired by the Marvel Comics character Wolverine — were created. In Mortal Kombat: Armageddon, he is seen with a row of spikes projecting from the back of his head. His arm blades are the centerpiece of his special moves and Fatalities. Mortal Kombat 11 changes the Tarkatan arm blades designs from being sharp metallic blades into more organic bone blades.

Other media

In the Mortal Kombat comic book series by Malibu Comics, Baraka plays supporting roles in the miniseries Goro: Prince of Pain (1994) and Battlewave (1995), and was the subject of his own one-shot issue published in June 1995. He was portrayed in all instances as a violent brawn-over-brains type who spoke in broken English. 

Baraka appeared briefly in the 1997 feature film Mortal Kombat: Annihilation and was played by stuntman Dennis Keiffer. He is killed in a brief fight scene with Liu Kang and has no dialogue, and is not identified by name save for the closing credits. Baraka has an expanded role in the film's novelization, in which he partakes in the opening invasion of Earth alongside Kahn's other generals.

Baraka appeared in director Kevin Tancharoen's 2010 short film Mortal Kombat: Rebirth, played by martial artist Lateef Crowder. His origins are changed therein into his being a former plastic surgeon named Alan Zane, who, after accidentally killing a patient, goes psychotic and murders over two dozen more. He then mutilates his face with numerous piercings and filed-down teeth, then attaches a pair of long metal blades to his forearms. He later kills Johnny Cage — working undercover for Jax — in a fight.  These changes were not carried over into Tancharoen's Mortal Kombat: Legacy web series, in which Baraka appears in one episode in the 2011 first season with his backstory reverted to his original Outworld origins.

Baraka briefly appeared in the 2021 animated film Mortal Kombat Legends: Scorpion's Revenge, in which he has no dialogue and is killed in a fight against Cage.

Reception
In 2009, Baraka ranked third on GameDaily's list of the "top ten ugliest game characters". Dan Ryckert of Game Informer, in 2010, noted him among the characters wanted for the 2011 reboot game, as he felt that "people love Baraka" yet noted his absence in subsequent releases since his series debut. Baraka has otherwise received positive reception from gaming media outlets for his character and Fatalities.

Notes

References

Action film characters
Action film villains
Demon characters in video games
Extraterrestrial characters in video games
Fictional martial artists in video games
Fictional Hung Ga practitioners
Fictional Pencak Silat practitioners
Fictional half-demons
Fictional illeists
Fictional cannibals
Fictional mass murderers
Fictional warlords in video games
Male characters in video games
Male film villains
Male video game villains
Mortal Kombat characters
Mutant characters in video games
Video game antagonists
Video game bosses
Video game characters introduced in 1993
Video game mascots